The 1998–99 Polska Liga Hokejowa season was the 64th season of the Polska Liga Hokejowa, the top level of ice hockey in Poland. 14 teams participated in the league, and Unia Oswiecim won the championship.

Final round

Qualification round

Playoffs

External links
 Season on hockeyarchives.info

Polska Hokej Liga seasons
Polska
Polska